Vale (Guernésiais: Lé Vale; French: Le Valle) is one of the ten parishes of Guernsey in the Bailiwick of Guernsey, Channel Islands.

In 933 the islands, formerly under the control of William I, then Duchy of Brittany were annexed by the Duchy of Normandy. The island of Guernsey and the other Channel Islands represent the last remnants of the medieval Duchy of Normandy.

Much of the Vale parish belonging to the fief Saint Michael, which benefited the Benedictine monks who lived in an abbey that had been built next to the Vale Church from when it was granted in 1032 by Robert of Normandy who had apparently been caught in a storm and his ship had ended up safe in Guernsey. The rights to the fief were removed by Henry VIII when he undertook the Dissolution of the Monasteries.

Vale Castle 

The Castle of Saint Michael, now called Vale Castle, has an origin going back at least 1,000 years and was used as a refuge from pirate attacks. It was probably started in the late 10th century. In 1372 Owain Lawgoch, a claimant to the Welsh throne, attacked Guernsey at the head of a free company, on behalf of France. This event is popularly called La Descente des Aragousais. Owain Lawgoch withdrew after killing 400 of the Island militia. The poem of the same name refers to the castle as the Château de l'Archange, the location of the last-ditch stand against the insurgents.

In 1615 the island was required to maintain the Vale Castle, while the Crown maintained Castle Cornet. It has been a focal point for defence; the most recent modifications were undertaken by the German occupiers.

Modern era 

Until 1806 the parish occupied territory on the mainland of Guernsey, the Vingtaine de l'Epine, as well as the whole of Le Clos du Valle, a tidal island forming the northern extremity of Guernsey separated from the mainland by Le Braye du Valle, a tidal channel. Le Braye was drained and reclaimed in 1806 by the British Government as a defence measure. Vale now consists of two non-contiguous territories.

The Vale postal code mainly starts with GY3 with some starting GY8.

Features

The features of the parish include:
 Churches:
 Vale Parish Church, St Michel du Valle 
 Vale Mission Fellowship
 St Pauls Methodist Church
 Parish war memorial at Vale Avenue-Braye Road Cross Roads
 Bordeaux Harbour
 The Vale Mill (the parishes most prominent landmark) 
 Northern half of Saint Sampson's Town
 Northern half of Saint Sampson's Harbour 
 Vale Pond, nature reserve 
 Beaucette marina
 Military:
 Parish war memorial at Vale Avenue-Braye Road Cross Roads
 Vale Castle
 Fort le Marchant
 Fort Doyle
 Fort Pembroke
 Rousse Tower 
 Eight Guernsey loophole towers numbered 4 to 11
 Beaucette Battery dating from the Napoleonic Wars
 La Lochande Battery dating from the Napoleonic Wars
 Nid L'Herbe Battery and Magazine dating from the Napoleonic Wars
 Portinfer Battery dating from the Napoleonic Wars
 German fortifications, built during the occupation 1940-45
 Archaeology:
 Le Dolmen de Déhus, which incorporates a megalithic art carving known as Le Gardien 
 La Varde passage grave, the largest dolmen on the island
 Les Fouaillages, L'Ancresse Common
 La Platte Mare, cist in circle
 La Mare es Mauves, cist in circle 
 Martelo 7, cist in circle
 Beaches
 Pembroke (MCS recommended)
 L'Ancresse 
 Ladies Bay 
 Bordeaux Harbour 
 A number of protected buildings 

The parish of the Vale hosts:
 Guernsey Electricity Power Station
 Fort le Marchant shooting range
 numerous industrial premises
 Maison Maritaine
 Vale Douzaine Room
 Vale Primary School
 18 hole golf course on L'Ancresse Common
 Annual music festival 'Vale Earth Fair' at the Vale Castle
 numerous quarries
 many old and some still in use, vineries. (greenhouses)
 Countryside walks 
 A weekly 5 km Parkrun event

Other
The parish was twinned with the Normandy port of  Barneville-Carteret in 1987.

Politics
Vale comprises the whole of the Vale administrative division

In the 2016 Guernsey general election there was a 3,774 or 74% turnout to elect six Deputies. Those elected (in order of votes received) being Matt Fallaize, Dave Jones, Mary Lowe, Laurie Queripel, Jeremy Smithies and Sarah Hansmann Rouxel.

Dave Jones died in July 2016 and a by-election was held in October 2016 to elect a replacement.

References

Parishes of Guernsey